Riksvei 120 (Rv120) runs between Skedsmovollen and Mosesvingen, Skedsmo.

Prior to 1 January 2010 the road ran between Hurdal and Moss, see fylkesvei 120.

120
Roads in Skedsmo
Roads in Viken